Joseph Muscatt (born 15 December 1997) is a footballer who plays as a defender for Braintree Town.

Club career
Muscatt began his career with Tottenham Hotspur at the age of ten, before being released at the end of the 2016–17 season. Later that summer he joined Bolton Wanderers after a trial period a signed his first professional deal the following year, agreeing a one-year deal. In January 2019, he joined League Two side Salford City on a one-month loan deal. He left Bolton Wanderers at the end of his contract in the summer of 2019. In July 2020, Muscatt joined the reserve team of German club Paderborn. In March 2022, he joined Billericay Town after a spell with Welling United.

On 13 July 2022, Muscatt agreed to join fellow National League South side,  Braintree Town.

International career
On 29 September 2020, Muscatt received his first call-up to the Malta national team. On 7 October 2020, he made his senior international debut, starting in a 2–0 friendly win over Gibraltar.

Personal life
Muscatt holds a Maltese passport.

Career statistics

References

External links

1997 births
Living people
People with acquired Maltese citizenship
Maltese footballers
Malta international footballers
English footballers
English people of Maltese descent
Association football defenders
Bolton Wanderers F.C. players
Salford City F.C. players
English Football League players
National League (English football) players
English expatriate footballers
Expatriate footballers in Germany
English expatriate sportspeople in Germany
SC Paderborn 07 II players
Welling United F.C. players
Billericay Town F.C. players
Braintree Town F.C. players